Triplachne is a genus of seaside plants in the grass family, native to shorelines in the Mediterranean region from the Canary Islands to Turkey. The only known species is Triplachne nitens, called shining grass. It is native to Spain (incl Canary + Balearic Is), Portugal (incl Madeira), Sicily, Greece (incl Crete), Algeria, Morocco, Libya, Tunisia, Egypt (incl Sinai), Turkey, Cyprus, Palestine, Israel.

References

Pooideae
Monotypic Poaceae genera